Janus  is an inner satellite of Saturn. It is also known as Saturn X. It is named after the mythological Janus.

History

Discovery 
Janus was identified by Audouin Dollfus on 15 December 1966 and given the temporary designation . Previously,  had photographed Janus on 29 October 1966 without realising it. On 18 December, Richard Walker observed an object in the same orbit as Janus, but whose position could not be reconciled with the previous observations. Twelve years later, in October 1978, Stephen M. Larson and John W. Fountain realised that the 1966 observations were best explained by two distinct objects (Janus and Epimetheus) sharing very similar orbits, Walker is now credited with the discovery of Epimetheus. Voyager 1 confirmed this orbital configuration in 1980. (See co-orbital moon for a more detailed description of their unique arrangement.)

Observational history
Janus was observed on subsequent occasions and given different provisional designations. Pioneer 11 three energetic-particle detectors detected its "shadow" when the probe flew by Saturn on 1 September 1979. Janus was observed by Dan Pascu on 19 February 1980, and then by John W. Fountain, Stephen M. Larson, Harold J. Reitsema and Bradford A. Smith on 23 February 1980.

Name 
Janus is named after the two-faced Roman god Janus. Although the name was informally proposed soon after the initial 1966 discovery, it was not officially adopted until 1983, when Epimetheus was also named.

The Oxford English Dictionary lists the adjectival form of the moon's name as Janian.

Orbit 

Janus's orbit is co-orbital with that of Epimetheus. Janus's mean orbital radius from Saturn was, as of 2006, only 50 km less than that of Epimetheus, a distance smaller than either moon's mean radius. In accordance with Kepler's laws of planetary motion, the closer orbit is completed more quickly. Because of the small difference, it is completed in only about 30 seconds less. Each day, the inner moon is an additional 0.25° farther around Saturn than the outer moon. As the inner moon catches up to the outer moon, their mutual gravitational attraction increases the inner moon's momentum and decreases that of the outer moon. This added momentum means that the inner moon's distance from Saturn and orbital period are increased, and the outer moon's are decreased. The timing and magnitude of the momentum exchange is such that the moons effectively swap orbits, never approaching closer than about 10,000 km. At each encounter Janus's orbital radius changes by ~20 km and Epimetheus's by ~80 km: Janus's orbit is less affected because it is four times as massive as Epimetheus. The exchange takes place close to every four years; the last close approaches occurred in January 2006, 2010, 2014, and 2018, 2022 and the next in 2026. This is the only such orbital configuration known in the Solar System.

The orbital relationship between Janus and Epimetheus can be understood in terms of the circular restricted three-body problem, as a case in which the two moons (the third body being Saturn) are similar in size to each other.

Physical characteristics 

Janus is extensively cratered with several craters larger than 30 km, but has few linear features. Janus's surface appears to be older than Prometheus's but younger than Pandora's.

Janus has a very low density and relatively high albedo, meaning that it is likely very icy and porous (a rubble pile).

Features
Craters on Janus, like those on Epimetheus, are named after characters in the legend of Castor and Pollux.

Interactions with rings 

A faint dust ring is present around the region occupied by the orbits of Janus and Epimetheus, as revealed by images taken in forward-scattered light by the Cassini spacecraft in 2006. The ring has a radial extent of about 5000 km. Its source is particles blasted off their surfaces by meteoroid impacts, which then form a diffuse ring around their orbital paths.

Along with Epimetheus, Janus acts as a shepherd moon, maintaining the sharp outer edge of the A Ring in a 7:6 orbital resonance. The effect is more obvious when the more massive Janus is on the resonant (inner) orbit.

Gallery

In popular culture 
 In the book Pushing Ice by Alastair Reynolds, Janus plays a major role. At the beginning of the book, it suddenly deviates from its normal orbit and accelerates out of the solar system.

See also 

 Saturn's moons in fiction

Notes

References

Bibliography

 
 
 
 
 
 
 
 
 
 
 
 
 
 
 
  (supporting online material, table S1)

External links 

 Janus Profile by NASA's Solar System Exploration
 The Planetary Society: Janus
 
 QuickTime illustration of co-orbital motion from Murray and Dermott
 Cassini image of Janus and Epimetheus near the time of their orbital swap.
 Janus nomenclature from the USGS planetary nomenclature page

 
Moons of Saturn
Co-orbital moons
19661215
Moons with a prograde orbit